Abdication is the act of formally relinquishing monarchical authority. Abdications have played various roles in the succession procedures of monarchies. While some cultures have viewed abdication as an extreme abandonment of duty, in other societies (such as pre-Meiji Restoration Japan), abdication was a regular event and helped maintain stability during political succession.

Historically, abdications have occurred both by force (where the regnant was forced to abdicate on pain of death or other severe consequences) and voluntarily. Some rulers are deemed to have abdicated in absentia, vacating the physical throne and thus their position of power, although these judgements were generally pronounced by successors with vested interests in seeing the throne abdicated, and often without or despite the direct input of the abdicating monarch.

Recently, due to the largely ceremonial nature of the regnant in many constitutional monarchies, many monarchs have abdicated due to old age, such as the monarchs of Spain, Cambodia, the Netherlands and Japan.

Terminology

The word abdication is derived from the Latin abdicatio meaning to disown or renounce (ab, away from, and dicare, to proclaim). In its broadest sense abdication is the act of renouncing and resigning from any formal office, but it is applied especially to the supreme office of state. In Roman law the term was also applied to the disowning of a family member, such as disinheriting a son. Today the term commonly applies to monarchs. An elected or appointed official is said to resign rather than to abdicate. A notable exception is the voluntary relinquishing of the office of Bishop of Rome (and thus sovereign of the Vatican City State) by the pope, called papal resignation or papal renunciation.

Historical examples
In certain cultures, the abdication of a monarch was seen as a profound and shocking abandonment of royal duty. As a result, abdications usually only occurred in the most extreme circumstances of political turmoil or violence. For other cultures, abdication was a much more routine element of succession.

Roman Empire 
Among the most notable abdications of antiquity are those of Lucius Quinctius Cincinnatus, the Roman dictator, in 458 and 439 BCE; Lucius Cornelius Sulla, the Roman dictator, in 79 BC; Emperor Diocletian in AD 305; and Emperor Romulus Augustulus in AD 476.

The papacy, the Papal States and Vatican City

Due to the complex nature of the office of pope (head of the worldwide Roman Catholic Church and sovereign of the Papal States from 754 to 1870 and of Vatican City since 1929), a papal abdication involves both the spiritual and the secular sphere. Technically, the correct term for a reigning pope voluntarily stepping down as Bishop of Rome is renunciation or resignation, as regulated in Canon 332 §2 of the 1983 Code of Canon Law.

The debate is open about some disputed resignations in the early middle ages: the last three popes to resign were Celestine V in 1294, Gregory XII in 1415, to end the Western Schism, and Benedict XVI in 2013, who was succeeded by the current pope, Francis. Benedict's resignation, which occurred 598 years after the last time a pope did so, and 719 years after the last one who renounced entirely on his own volition, was an event unheard of for more than half a millennium, and was met with a great deal of surprise worldwide.

Britain
One of the most notable abdications in recent history is that of King Edward VIII of the United Kingdom and the Dominions. In 1936 Edward abdicated to marry American divorcée Wallis Simpson, over the objections of the British establishment, the governments of the Commonwealth, the royal family and the Church of England. It was the first time in history that the British or English crown was surrendered entirely voluntarily. Richard II of England, for example, was forced to abdicate after power was seized by his paternal first cousin, Henry Bolingbroke, while Richard was abroad. 

During the Glorious Revolution in 1688, James II of England and VII of Scotland fled to France, dropping the Great Seal of the Realm into the Thames, and the question was discussed in Parliament whether he had forfeited the throne or had abdicated. The latter designation was agreed upon in spite of James's protest, and in a full assembly of the Lords and Commons it was resolved "that King James II having endeavoured to subvert the constitution of the kingdom, by breaking the original contract between king and people, and, by the advice of Jesuits and other wicked persons, having violated the fundamental laws, and having withdrawn himself out of this kingdom, has abdicated the government, and that the throne is thereby vacant." The Scottish Parliament pronounced a decree of forfeiture and deposition.

In Scotland, Mary, Queen of Scots, was forced to abdicate in favour of her one-year-old son, James VI.

Today, because the title to the Crown depends upon statute, particularly the Act of Settlement 1701, a royal abdication can be effected only by an act of Parliament; under the terms of the Statute of Westminster 1931, such an act must be agreed by the parliaments of all extant signatories of the Statute. To give legal effect to the abdication of King Edward VIII, His Majesty's Declaration of Abdication Act 1936 was passed.

Egypt
After mass protests against King Farouk began on 23 July 1952, the military forced Farouk I to abdicate in favour of his infant son Fuad II during the Egyptian revolution of 1952. Farouk was exiled to Italy.

Germany
The chaos of Germany's defeat in the First World War forced German Emperor (Kaiser) Wilhelm II to abdicate his throne as German Emperor and consequentially, his throne as King of Prussia. The following Treaty of Versailles resulted in the abolition of the monarchy, leading to the other German kings, dukes, princes and other nobility to abdicate and renounce their royalty titles.

Japan
In Japanese history, abdication was used very often, and in fact occurred more often than death on the throne. In those days, most executive authority resided in the hands of regents (see Sesshō and Kampaku), and the emperor's chief task was priestly, containing so many repetitive rituals that it was deemed the incumbent emperor deserved pampered retirement as an honoured retired emperor after a service of around ten years. A tradition developed that an emperor should accede to the throne relatively young. The high-priestly duties were deemed possible for a walking child; and a dynast who had passed his toddler years was regarded as suitable and old enough; reaching the age of legal majority was not a requirement. Thus, many Japanese emperors have acceded as children, some only 6 or 8 years old. Childhood apparently helped the monarch to endure tedious duties and to tolerate subjugation to political power brokers, as well as sometimes to cloak the truly powerful members of the imperial dynasty. Almost all Japanese empresses and dozens of emperors abdicated and lived the rest of their lives in pampered retirement, wielding influence behind the scenes, often with more power than they had had while on the throne (see Cloistered rule). Several emperors abdicated while still in their teens. These traditions show in Japanese folklore, theatre, literature and other forms of culture, where the emperor is usually described or depicted as an adolescent.

Before the Meiji Restoration, Japan had eleven reigning empresses. Over half of Japanese empresses abdicated once a suitable male descendant was considered to be old enough to rule. There is also no provision for abdication in the Imperial Household Law, the Meiji Constitution, or the current 1947 Constitution of Japan.

After the defeat of Japan in World War II, many members of the Imperial Family, such as Princes Chichibu, Takamatsu and Higashikuni, pressured then-Emperor Hirohito to abdicate so that one of the princes could serve as regent until Crown Prince Akihito came of age. On February 27, 1946, the Emperor's youngest brother, Prince Mikasa (Takahito), even stood up in the privy council and indirectly urged the Emperor to step down and accept responsibility for Japan's defeat. U.S. Army General Douglas MacArthur insisted that Emperor Hirohito remain on the throne. MacArthur saw the emperor as a symbol of the continuity and cohesion of the Japanese people.

On 13 July 2016, national broadcaster NHK reported that Emperor Akihito intended to abdicate in favour of his eldest son Crown Prince Naruhito within a few years, citing his age; an abdication within the Imperial Family had not occurred since Emperor Kōkaku abdicated in 1817. However, senior officials within the Imperial Household Agency denied that there was any official plan for the monarch to abdicate. A potential abdication by the Emperor required an amendment to the Imperial Household Law, which at that time had no provisions for such a move. On 8 August 2016, the Emperor gave a rare televised address, where he emphasized his advanced age and declining health; this address was interpreted as an implication of his intention to abdicate. On 1 December 2017, Prime Minister Shinzo Abe announced that Emperor Akihito would step down on 30 April 2019. The announcement came after a meeting of the Imperial Household Council.

On 19 May 2017, the bill that would allow Akihito to abdicate was issued by the Japanese government's cabinet. On 8 June 2017, the National Diet passed a one-off bill allowing Akihito to abdicate, and for the government to begin arranging the process of handing over the position to Crown Prince Naruhito. The abdication officially occurred at the end of 30 April 2019.

India
According to Jain sources written almost 800 years after his reign, Chandragupta, the first emperor of the Mauryan Dynasty abdicated and became a Jain monk in the last years of his life.

Other examples in recent history

Hussein ibn Ali al-Hashimi, Sharif of Mecca abdicated the Kingdom of Hejaz in October 1924.

In recent decades, the monarchs or leaders of the Netherlands, Belgium, Luxembourg, Qatar, Cambodia, Bhutan and Japan have abdicated as a result of old age. In the Netherlands, the last three monarchs Wilhelmina, Juliana, and Beatrix have all abdicated. In all three instances, this was done to pass the throne to the heir sooner.

In June 2014, King Juan Carlos of Spain announced his intent to abdicate in favour of his son, Felipe. Felipe took the throne as King Felipe VI on June 19.

See also
Lists of office-holders
List of monarchs who lost their thrones in the 20th century
List of monarchs who lost their thrones in the 21st century
Papal renunciation
List of resignations from government - republic equivalent

References

Attribution

External links

 
History of the papacy